Gregor Robertson may refer to:

 Gregor Robertson (footballer) (born 1984), Scottish footballer
 Gregor Robertson (politician) (born 1964), Canadian politician